Fermented milk products or fermented dairy products, also known as cultured dairy foods, cultured dairy products, or cultured milk products, are dairy foods that have been fermented with lactic acid bacteria such as Lactobacillus, Lactococcus, and Leuconostoc. The fermentation process increases the shelf life of the product while enhancing its taste and improving the digestibility of its milk.  There is evidence that fermented milk products have been produced since around 10,000 BC. A range of different Lactobacilli strains has been grown in laboratories allowing for many cultured milk products with different flavors and characteristics.

Products
Many different types of cultured milk products can be found around the world including milk, cheese, yogurt, other cultured dairy foods, ice cream and more.

Soured milk

Soured cream

Comparison chart

* Streptococcus lactis has been renamed to Lactococcus lactis subsp. lactis

See also

 List of dairy products
 List of yogurt-based dishes and beverages

References

External links

Milk

Sour foods